Emma Kathleen Hepburn Ferrer (born May 1994) is an American artist and former model.

Early life
Emma Kathleen Hepburn Ferrer was born in May 1994, in Morges, Switzerland, the daughter of producer Sean Hepburn Ferrer and Leila Flannigan. She is the granddaughter of actors Audrey Hepburn and Mel Ferrer. Her parents divorced when she was 6 years old. She has two younger half-siblings. Ferrer spent her childhood in Los Angeles and Florence, and briefly attended Crossroads School for Arts & Sciences. She previously studied ballet. She earned a degree from the Jersey City, New Jersey, campus of Italy's Florence Academy of Art.

Career
Ferrer made her magazine modeling debut on the cover of Harper's Bazaar September 2014 issue. Ferrer was signed by Storm Management. She additionally appeared in a number of editorial publications and campaigns, including Dior, Japanese luxury skincare brand Kosé, Givenchy, and Tiffany & Co. She played a supporting role in the feature film The Man in the Attic, a psychological thriller directed by Constantine Venetopoulos, released in 2019. Ferrer and her father both contributed to Audrey (2020), a documentary about her grandmother directed by Helena Coan.

Ferrer resides in Brooklyn, though she considers Italy to be her home. She works as an art liaison and curator in New York City.

Charity work
Ferrer is a spokesperson for UNICEF, and a UNHCR Ambassador to the United States. In December 2018, Ferrer was the keynote speaker at a UNICEF ball, in a continuation of her grandmother's work with the organization. Ferrer does counseling work with female detainees at Rikers Island.

References

External links
 

Living people
1994 births
American female models
American people of Cuban descent	
American people of Irish descent
American people of Dutch descent	
American people of British descent	
American people of Austrian descent
Van Heemstra (family)
Van Hogendorp (family)
People from Morges

Audrey Hepburn